Overtime is a method of determining a winner in an ice hockey game when the score is tied after regulation. The main methods of determining a winner in a tied game are the overtime period (commonly referred to as overtime), the shootout, or a combination of both. If league rules dictate a finite time in which overtime may be played, with no penalty shoot-out to follow, the game's winning team may or may not be necessarily determined.

Overtime periods

Overtime periods are extra periods beyond the third regulation period during a game, where normal hockey rules apply. Although in the past, full-length overtime periods were played, overtimes today are golden goal (a form of sudden death), meaning that the game ends immediately when a player scores a goal.

North American overtime 
From November 21, 1942, when overtime (a non-sudden death extra period of 10 minutes duration) was eliminated due to war time restrictions and continuing until the 1983–84 season, all NHL regular-season games tied after 60 minutes of play ended as ties. On June 23, 1983, the NHL introduced a regular-season sudden death overtime period of five minutes. If the five-minute overtime period ended with no scoring, the game ended as a tie. (The World Hockey Association had used a 10-minute, sudden death regular season overtime period during its seven-year existence.) In the first games to go to overtime, on October 5, 1983, the Minnesota North Stars and Los Angeles Kings skated to a 3–3 tie, and the Detroit Red Wings and Winnipeg Jets tied 6–6. The first regular-season game decided by overtime was on October 8, 1983, as the New York Islanders beat the Washington Capitals 8–7.

In 1987–88 and since 1995, the American Hockey League has awarded teams one point in the standings for an overtime loss (OTL). In 1998, the AHL introduced a rule where teams will play the five-minute overtime period with four skaters and a goaltender, rather than at full strength (five skaters), except in two-man advantage situations. In a two-man advantage situation, the team with the advantage will play with five skaters against three skaters. The rule was popular and adopted by the NHL and ECHL the next season.

Alex Ovechkin has the record for most NHL overtime goals with 25.

In the Stanley Cup playoffs and in all tiebreaker games, overtime periods are played like regulation periods – teams are at full strength (five skaters, barring penalties), there is no shootout, and each overtime period is 20 minutes with full intermissions between overtime periods. The game ends when either team scores a goal.

In many leagues (including the NHL for regular-season games since the 2005–06 season) and in international competitions, a failure to reach a decision in a single overtime may lead to a shootout. Some leagues may eschew overtime periods altogether and end games in shootout should teams be tied at the end of regulation. In the ECHL, the AHL, and the Southern Professional Hockey League, regular season overtime periods are played three on three for one five-minute period, with penalties resulting in the opponents skating one additional player on ice (up to two additional players) for each penalty. If the penalised player returns to the ice, the game becomes 4-on-4 or 5-on-5 until the next stoppage of play, when it becomes 3-on-3. Prior to the 2014–15 season, the AHL set the overtime period at seven minutes, but reverted to the now-standard five-minute period the following year. The idea of using 3-on-3 skaters for the entirety of a five-minute overtime period for a regular season game was adopted by the NHL on June 24, 2015, for use in the 2015–16 NHL season. The ECHL has changed the overtime to seven minutes for the 2019–20 season.

International overtime 
In IIHF play, rules for overtime depend on the stage of the competition.

New overtime procedures debuted at the 2019 IIHF World Championship that will be in effect for all IIHF championships, including from the 2022 Winter Olympics hereafter. All overtime periods will be 3-on-3 regardless of round robin or preliminary (five minutes with a three-round shootout), knockout rounds including third place games (ten minutes with a five-round shootout), or the championship (twenty minutes, no shootout). In the championship game only, if that overtime is scoreless, a full intermission will be conducted before the procedure repeats. The overtime ends on whoever scores next. In all cases, teams will change ends.

Shootout

International shootouts
In international competition, shootouts (or more formally, game-winning shots (GWS), and, in some European countries, bullets, or bullits), are often used. Each coach selects three skaters from their team to take penalty shots one at a time against the opposing goaltender, with teams alternating shots. Each team gets one shot per round. The winner is the team with more goals after three rounds or the team that amasses an unreachable advantage before then (ex. a team gains a two-goal lead with only one round left). If the shootout is tied after three rounds, tie-breaker rounds are played one at a time (with each team taking one additional shot) until there is a winner.

The IIHF first adopted the game-winning-shot procedure in 1992 when a new playoff procedure in the Winter Olympics and World Championships required a winner for each game. At that time, the shootout was five rounds and only used for knock-out games. In 2006, it was reduced to three rounds and used for all games, eliminating the possibility of tied games at IIHF events. Tie-breaker rounds are still used as needed, and the same or new players can take the tie-break shots, which is also done in reverse order. As of May 2016, all IIHF preliminary round games that are not decided by overtime, are decided by a three-round shootout. However, all playoff & bronze medal games of IIHF top level championships (especially the Olympics) are decided by five round shootouts.

Since 2019, the gold-medal game uses multiple 20-minute overtime periods of 3-on-3, and applies to both genders.

North American shootouts
Most lower minor leagues (ECHL, Central, UHL) have featured a shootout where, at the end of regulation, a shootout similar to the international tournament format is used.

However, in 2000, the ECHL adopted the AHL's four-on-four overtime before the shootout.

For the 2004–05 AHL season, the AHL adopted a five-man shootout, which was first used in that league in 1986–87. The standard five-man shootout is used after four-on-four overtime for all minor leagues in North America. The AHL switched to the NHL formatted three-man shootout for the 2014–15 season.

The Central Collegiate Hockey Association added the shootout as of the 2008–09 season.

Following the lead of minor leagues, in the NHL's first post-lockout season of 2005–06, the league ends exhibition and regular season games still tied after a five-minute-length, three-skaters-per-side overtime period (as of the 2015–16 NHL season onwards) with a shootout. The NHL format is a three-round shootout with tiebreaker rounds as needed. All skaters (except goalies) on a team's roster must shoot before any player can shoot a second time. On December 16, 2014, the longest shootout in NHL history went to 20 rounds before Nick Bjugstad of the Florida Panthers scored to defeat the Washington Capitals; the previous record was 15 rounds.

The shootout is not used in the playoffs for any major North American league. Instead, full 20-minute overtime periods are played until one team scores a goal.

In the National Hockey League and American Hockey League All-Star Skills Competitions, the competition ends in a penalty shootout known as the Breakaway Relay.

Tactics

Tactics are very important during penalty shots and overtime shootouts for both the shooter and the goalie. Both shooters and goalies commonly consult their teammates and coaches for advice on the opposing player's style of play. Shooters often consider the goalie's strengths and weaknesses (such as a fast glove or stick save), preferred goaltending style (such as butterfly or stand-up) and method of challenging the shooter. Goaltenders often consider the shooter's shot preference, expected angle of attack, a patented move a shooter commonly uses and even handedness of the shooter.

Most shooters attempt to out-deke the goalie in order to create a better scoring chance. Former Detroit Red Wings forward Pavel Datsyuk and New York Rangers forward Martin St. Louis are examples of players who commonly use this tactic. However, it is not uncommon for a shooter to simply shoot for an opening without deking. This is commonly referred to as sniping. This is most commonly performed when a goalie challenges a shooter by giving them an open hole (by keeping a glove, pad or stick out of position or being out of sound goaltending position altogether to tempt the shooter to aim for the given opening). Former NHL forwards Markus Näslund and Brett Hull are two players commonly referred to as snipers. Very rarely a shooter may take a slapshot or wrist shot from the point or top of the slot. This is almost exclusively performed when a shooter either has a high level of confidence in their shot or they attempt to catch the goalie by surprise. Retired player Brian Rolston, Detroit Red Wings winger Todd Bertuzzi, Philadelphia Flyers defenseman Chris Pronger, and Vancouver Canucks winger Daniel Sedin have all used this tactic with success.

List of notable overtime games
The longest overtime game in history was in Norwegian GET-ligaen. The game ended after 157:14 of overtime, in the 8th overtime period.

NHL
This is a list of all National Hockey League (NHL) playoff games that went into at least three overtimes (winning team is bold).

*Stanley Cup Finals game
**Stanley Cup winning goal
† Series-clinching goal
†† Game 7
§ Game played at a neutral site
Ω Arena was demolished

Notable NHL playoff overtime games 

 March 24, 1936: The Detroit Red Wings' Mud Bruneteau ends the longest Stanley Cup playoff game to date, scoring the game's only goal in a 1–0 victory over the Montreal Maroons. The goal came at 116:30 of sextuple overtime, for a total of 176:30 of game play. It is also the longest NHL game played. The game is a mere 3:30 short of the equivalent of playing three games back-to-back-to-back. Normie Smith made an unofficial record 92 saves in that game.
 February 4, 1939: The Boston Bruins' Mel Hill scores his third overtime goal of the Bruins' Stanley Cup semi-final series against the New York Rangers, setting an unsurpassed (as of now) NHL record for most overtime goals in a single playoff series, earning him the nickname thereafter of "Sudden Death" Hill. The series itself involves four overtime games, two of which go to triple overtime.
 April 23, 1950: Pete Babando scores at 8:31 of double overtime to give the Detroit Red Wings a 4–3 win for the title in the seventh game of the 1950 Stanley Cup Finals over the New York Rangers. It is the first time that a seventh game of a Final series goes to overtime.
 April 21, 1951: Bill Barilko scores at 2:53 of overtime to give the Toronto Maple Leafs a 3–2 win in the fifth game of the 1951 Stanley Cup Finals over the Montreal Canadiens for a 4–1 title victory. All five games in the series need to have overtime to be decided. Barilko was killed in a private plane crash in a remote part of northern Ontario a few months later.
 April 16, 1954: Tony Leswick's shot hit Montreal Canadiens' defenceman Doug Harvey's glove and went into the net at 4:20 of overtime to give the Detroit Red Wings a 2–1 win  and the title in the seventh game of the 1954 Stanley Cup Finals over the Canadiens. No seventh game of a Final series has gone to overtime since.
 April 23, 1964: Bobby Baun of the Toronto Maple Leafs nets a game winner against Detroit 1:43 into overtime in game six of the Finals to tie the series 3–all. The goal is notable because Baun broke his ankle earlier in the game. It was frozen and taped, and Baun returned to the ice to score the winning goal.
 May 10, 1970: One of the most indelible moments in sports history is the sight of Bobby Orr's "in flight" goal that gave the Boston Bruins a 4–3 win and a four-game sweep of the St. Louis Blues for the title.
 May 24, 1980: Bob Nystrom of the New York Islanders scores the Stanley Cup clinching goal at 7:11 of overtime, beating the Philadelphia Flyers in six games for the title.
 April 14, 1981: After sitting on the bench for the entire game, Mike Crombeen scored the winning goal at 5:16 of double overtime to give the St. Louis Blues a 4–3 win over the Pittsburgh Penguins.
 April 10, 1982: "Miracle on Manchester" – Rookie Daryl Evans gives the Los Angeles Kings a 6–5 win over the Edmonton Oilers at 2:35 of overtime. The Kings had trailed the Oilers 5–0 after the second period of game three of the Smythe Division semi-final. This still remains the largest single game playoff comeback in NHL history.
 May 12, 1986: Doug Wickenheiser's overtime goal gives the St. Louis Blues a 6–5 win over the Calgary Flames in game six of the Campbell Conference Final. The goal, known as the "Monday Night Miracle", caps a 5–2 comeback and makes it more impressive that the three goals needed to tie the game were scored in the last ten minutes of the third period.
 May 18, 1986: A Brian Skrudland goal ends the shortest overtime in NHL history at just nine seconds. The winning goal gives the Montreal Canadiens a 3–2 victory over the Calgary Flames in game two of the 1986 Stanley Cup Finals.
 April 18, 1987: "Easter Epic" – Pat LaFontaine of New York Islanders scores a goal against Washington Capitals at 8:47 of quadruple overtime which ends the longest game seven in NHL playoff history. Islanders goaltender Kelly Hrudey makes a record 73 saves.
 May 15, 1990: After hardly playing in overtime, Petr Klima came off the bench late in triple overtime and scored almost immediately to end the longest overtime in NHL Finals history, with 4:47 left. The goal gave the Edmonton Oilers a 3–2 victory over the Boston Bruins to open the 1990 Stanley Cup Finals, setting the stage for the Oilers' fifth cup in seven years.
 April 24, 1993: In game four of the Adams division semi-final between the Buffalo Sabres and the Boston Bruins, Sabres forward Brad May scores in overtime to give Buffalo a 6–5 win and a four-game sweep of the Bruins in the series. Due to Buffalo commentator Rick Jeanneret's colorful play call when May scored, this game has been referred to in Buffalo as "May Day".
 April to June 1993: After losing in overtime of game one of the Adams division semi-final to the Quebec Nordiques, the Montreal Canadiens go on to win ten consecutive overtime games en route to winning the Stanley Cup. The Habs score another overtime winner the following year against the Boston Bruins, making it eleven consecutive playoff overtime wins.
 May 14, 1993: In game seven of the Patrick Division Finals, David Volek who spent most of the season as a healthy scratch, scored the series winning goal to give the New York Islanders a 4–3 victory ending the Pittsburgh Penguins chances at a three-peat.
 April 27, 1994: Dominik Hasek of the Buffalo Sabres stops all 70 shots produced by the New Jersey Devils as Dave Hannan scores the lone goal over a sprawling Martin Brodeur at 5:43 of quadruple overtime in game six of the Eastern Conference quarterfinal matchup. 
 April 30, 1994: Pavel Bure scores 2:20 into double overtime of the seventh game of the opening round of Vancouver's playoff series with Calgary. The win gives the Vancouver Canucks three consecutive overtime wins over the favored Calgary Flames, who squander a 3–1 series lead.
 May 27, 1994: Stephane Matteau scores the game-winning goal at 4:24 of double overtime with a wrap-around, beating Martin Brodeur and the New Jersey Devils in game seven, advancing the New York Rangers to the Stanley Cup Finals (where they would ultimately win it for the first time since 1940). It is Matteau's second goal in double overtime periods of the series.
 April 24, 1996: Petr Nedved scores with 44.6 seconds remaining in quadruple overtime to give the Pittsburgh Penguins a 3–2 win over the Washington Capitals to tie their Eastern Conference quarter-final series at two games all.
 June 10, 1996: Uwe Krupp became the 12th player in NHL history, and the first in 16 years, to end the Stanley Cup Finals in overtime, scoring a goal at 4:31 of triple overtime, giving the Colorado Avalanche a 1–0 win and a sweep of the Florida Panthers for the title.
 June 19, 1999: Brett Hull scores with 5:09 left in triple overtime of game six to win the title for the Dallas Stars over the Buffalo Sabres. The goal is considered controversial by some fans due to disagreement on if the goal by Hull was legal or not. (see 1999 Stanley Cup Finals). Dallas won 2–1 for a 4–2 title victory.
 May 4, 2000: Keith Primeau of the Philadelphia Flyers put a shot over the left shoulder of Pittsburgh Penguins goaltender Ron Tugnutt with 7:59 left in quintuple overtime, ending the longest game since 1936.
 June 8, 2000: Jason Arnott scores on Dallas Stars' goalie Ed Belfour in double overtime of game six to give the New Jersey Devils their second title.
 April 11, 2007: Roberto Luongo, goaltender for the Vancouver Canucks, wins his first career playoff game while making 72 saves, one shy of Kelly Hrudey's record. The game is the sixth longest, going into quadruple overtime. Henrik Sedin scores the winning goal in the Western Quarterfinals, beating the Dallas Stars 5–4 in game 1. The game is Vancouver's longest in history, and the Star's second longest, behind their five-overtime loss to Anaheim in 2003.
 May 4, 2008: Brenden Morrow scores on San Jose Sharks goalie Evgeni Nabokov at 9:03 of quadruple overtime in game six of the Western Conference Semi-final between the Sharks and Stars. The game sees an incredible goaltending duel as Nabokov makes 53 saves in the loss while Marty Turco of Dallas makes 61 saves for the win.
 June 2, 2008: In game five of the 2008 Stanley Cup Finals, the Pittsburgh Penguins' Petr Sykora told Pierre Maguire of NBC that he would score the winning goal in overtime. At 9:57 of triple overtime, Sykora scored on Detroit Red Wings' goaltender Chris Osgood and sent the series back to Pittsburgh for game six. 
 June 9, 2010: Patrick Kane of the Chicago Blackhawks shoots a goal past Philadelphia Flyers goalie Michael Leighton 4:10 into overtime of game six of the Stanley Cup Finals to give the Blackhawks a 4–3 win over the Flyers for their first title since 1961.
 April 27, 2011: Alexandre Burrows of the Vancouver Canucks scored at 5:22 of overtime past Corey Crawford of the Chicago Blackhawks to win the series 4–3 and the game 2–1, sending the Canucks to the Western Conference Semifinals, avoiding squandering a 3–0 series lead and a 1–0 lead in game seven in the third period.
 June 4, 2011: Another Burrows goal ends the second-shortest overtime in NHL history at just eleven seconds. The winning goal gives the Vancouver Canucks a 3–2 victory over the Boston Bruins in game two of the Stanley Cup Finals.
 May 25, 2012: Adam Henrique of the New Jersey Devils scored at 1:03 into overtime past Henrik Lundqvist of the New York Rangers in game six of the Eastern Conference Final to send the Devils to the Stanley Cup Finals for the first time since 2003.
 May 13, 2013: Patrice Bergeron of the Boston Bruins scored at 6:05 of overtime past James Reimer of the Toronto Maple Leafs to win the series 4–3 and the game 5–4, to send the Bruins to the Conference Semifinals to face the Rangers. It also capped a historic comeback in a game seven, coming back from a three-goal deficit in the third period. With fifty–one seconds to go, they tied the game. The tying goal was also scored by Bergeron. The 2012–13 Boston Bruins became the first team in NHL history to do so in the Stanley Cup playoffs.
 June 12, 2013: Andrew Shaw scored with 7:52 left in triple overtime as the Chicago Blackhawks beat the Boston Bruins 4–3 to open the Stanley Cup Finals, ending the fifth-longest game in Stanley Cup Finals history.
 June 13, 2014: Alec Martinez took a rebound off a Tyler Toffoli shot blocked by Henrik Lundqvist and scored with 5:17 left in double overtime in game five of the 2014 Stanley Cup Finals, becoming the 16th player to win the Stanley Cup with an overtime goal as the Los Angeles Kings beat the New York Rangers 3–2, clinching the title 4–1 in the longest game in Kings history to that point (total game time 94:43). He became the first player to score two series-clinching playoff overtime goals in the same season since Martin Gelinas in 2004; on June 1, he scored 5:47 into overtime to defeat the Chicago Blackhawks 5–4 in game seven of the Western Conference Finals.
 May 13, 2015: Derek Stepan scored with 8:36 left in the first overtime in game seven in the Eastern Conference Second Round against the Washington Capitals to send the New York Rangers to the Eastern Conference Finals. The Capitals also had a 3–1 series lead before losing the final three games and ultimately losing the series.
 May 19, 2015: Marcus Kruger scored with 3:48 left in the third overtime in game two of the Western Conference Finals, as the Chicago Blackhawks beat the Anaheim Ducks, 3–2, tying the series at 1–1. This was Anaheim's first playoff loss at home that season and Chicago's longest overtime game to date. Chicago goalie Corey Crawford made 60 saves while defenceman Duncan Keith played seconds shy of 50 minutes on ice. Earlier in the second overtime period, Andrew Shaw used his head to direct the puck into the net, but the goal did not count.
 April 24, 2016: John Tavares scored the series-winner with 9:19 left in double overtime in game six of the Eastern Conference First Round as the New York Islanders won a playoff series for the first time since 1993, beating the Florida Panthers 2–1, for a 4–2 series victory. He beat Roberto Luongo off a rebound of his own shot with a wraparound. It ended the longest home game in Islanders' history. Tavares also scored with 53.2 seconds left in regulation to force overtime. Three of those games in this series have gone to overtime, this and game five needed two.
 May 10, 2016: Mike Fisher scored with 8:48 left in triple overtime in game four of the Western Conference Second Round as the Nashville Predators beat the San Jose Sharks, 4–3, to tie the series at two games all. His goal ended the longest playoff game in Predators' history. Joe Pavelski could have won it at 7:34 of overtime, but officials waved it off as he crashed into Pekka Rinne, pinning him down before the puck crossed the goal line.
 May 25, 2017: Chris Kunitz scored at 5:09 of double overtime as the Pittsburgh Penguins beat the Ottawa Senators to advance to play the Nashville Predators in the Stanley Cup Finals in winning game seven of the Eastern Conference Finals, 3–2. Sidney Crosby sent a soft backhand pass to Kunitz, whose knuckling shot beat Craig Anderson from the right faceoff circle.
 May 7, 2018: Evgeny Kuznetsov scored at 5:27 of overtime as the Washington Capitals eliminated the two-time defending champion Pittsburgh Penguins in game six of the Eastern Conference Second Round to advance to the Conference Finals for the first time in 20 years. Alexander Ovechkin passed the puck back to Kuznetsov, who tapped it away from Sidney Crosby on a turnover before beating Matt Murray between the pads.
 April 21, 2019: Tomas Hertl scored the first short-handed overtime goal in a multiple overtime game in Stanley Cup playoff history with his goal at 11:17 in double overtime to beat the host Vegas Golden Knights 2–1 to force a seventh game in the Western Conference First Round. Sharks goalie Martin Jones saved 58 of the Knights' 59 shots, a Sharks playoff game record.
 April 24, 2019: Brock McGinn deflected a pass from Justin Williams past Capitals' goaltender Braden Holtby at 11:05 into double overtime as the Carolina Hurricanes defeated the defending Stanley Cup champion Washington Capitals 4–3 in the third longest game seven in league history.
 August 11, 2020: Brayden Point scored his second goal of the game at 10:27 of quintuple overtime as the Tampa Bay Lightning beat the Columbus Blue Jackets 3–2 in game one of the Eastern Conference First Round. This was the fourth-longest game in the history of the league (which turned out to be the longest in twenty years). Columbus goalie Joonas Korpisalo made 85 saves, breaking the record in any NHL game, with the previous playoff record held by Kelly Hrudey (73, on April 18, 1987). This was also the longest game to be played at a neutral site.
 May 25, 2021: Kyle Connor scored at 6:52 of triple overtime as the Winnipeg Jets beat the Edmonton Oilers 4–3, to end their North Division Semifinal series. The goal capped the longest game in Jets/Thrashers' franchise history and completed the Jets' first ever playoff sweep.
 May 3, 2022: Evgeni Malkin scored at 5:58 of triple overtime as the Pittsburgh Penguins beat the host New York Rangers, 4-3, to open the Eastern Conference First Round. Rangers goalie Igor Shesterkin made 79 saves off Pens' 83 shots, a Rangers playoff game record. Louis Domingue became the first goaltender to enter a playoff game after multiple overtime periods when he entered the game at 9:18 of the second overtime following an injury to Pittsburgh goaltender Casey DeSmith.

Swedish ice hockey
This is a list of the longest games in the highest Swedish leagues.

KHL
This is a list of Kontinental Hockey League games that went to at least triple overtime.

Belarusian ice hockey
The longest game in Belarusian extraleague is game fifth of the 2021 Quarter-finals on March 10–11, 2021. HC Neman Grodno beat the HK Gomel, 2–1, at Gomel Ice Palace of Sports on a goal by Krystian Dziubiński at 9:04 of sextuple overtime. Maxim Gorodetsky was the winning goaltender for the Neman, making 78 saves.

Olympics – men's gold-medal game
This is a list of men's gold-medal games from the Olympics that needed overtime.

Olympics – women's gold-medal game
This is a list of women's gold-medal games from the Olympics that needed overtime.

*Game went to shootout.

Czech ice hockey

*Play-off finals game
**Play-off winning goal
† Series-clinching goal
†† Final game of series when series is tied (Game 5 in a best-of-5 series or Game 7 in best-of-7 series)

DEL
March 22, 2008: Philip Gogulla of the Cologne Sharks ends the longest German hockey game and the third longest worldwide, scoring the ninth-overall goal in a 5:4 victory over the Mannheim Eagles. The goal comes 8:16 into the sixth overtime period for a total of 108:16 of overtime. It is the third quarter-final game (best of seven) in the Kölnarena in Cologne in front of an audience of 17,000. The game had begun at 5:30 pm and ends at 12:15 am.

Norwegian ice hockey
March 12, 2017: Joakim Jensen of the Storhamar Ishockey ends the longest hockey game in history, scoring with 2:46 left in octuple overtime for a total of 157:14 of overtime, and 217:14 of hockey played. It was Game 5 of the quarter-finals of the 2016–17 GET-ligaen playoffs against the Sparta Warriors in the CC Amfi. About 1,000 out of the 5,500 people that attended the game watched the entire game. The game started at 18:00 and ended at 2:32 the next morning.

Notable minor league, college and junior overtimes

AHL
The longest game in AHL history is game four of the 2018 Atlantic Division Final on May 9, 2018. The Lehigh Valley Phantoms beat the Charlotte Checkers, 2–1, at Bojangles Coliseum on a goal by Alex Krushelnyski at 6:48 of quintuple overtime. Alex Lyon was the winning goaltender for the Phantoms, making 94 saves.

*Overtime format was one five-minute period followed by 20-minute periods
**Calder Cup Finals game

Canadian Interuniversity Sport – men
The University of New Brunswick Varsity Reds needed 61:53 of overtime (quadruple overtime) to defeat the Acadia University Axemen 3–2 on February 27, 2011, in game two of a best-of-five AUS semi-final series at Fredericton, New Brunswick. Nick MacNeil scored the game-winner at 11:53 of the seventh period overall.

York University Lions and Lakehead University Thunderwolves went to a fourth overtime period (50:13 minutes of overtime) on February 14, 2007, in Thunder Bay, Ontario, to decide a winner in OUA men's playoff hockey action. Lakehead won the game at the 13-second mark of the fourth overtime period.

Canadian Interuniversity Sport – women
Morgan McHaffie scored at 17:14 of sextuple overtime to lead the Queen's Golden Gaels to a 2–1 win over the host Guelph Gryphons in the first game of the best-of-three OUA women's hockey final, March 2, 2011. The game, which lasted 167 minutes and 14 seconds, including 107:14 of extra time, is the longest on record in CIS or NCAA hockey – women's or men's. Winning goaltender Mel Dodd-Moher made 66 saves, while Danielle Skoufranis made 44 saves in a losing cause. It is the longest game played sanctioned by Hockey Canada.

ECHL

* Championship Series game.

** Game 7

International Hockey League
On May 12, 2008, one of the longest games in IHL history, if not the longest, took place in Fort Wayne, Indiana. It was the seventh game of the Turner Cup Final between the hometown Fort Wayne Komets and Port Huron Icehawks. The game was tied 2–2 through regulation. The first two extra periods solved nothing, but 23 seconds into the third overtime period, at some point after midnight ET, Justin Hodgman scored the winning goal to give the Komets their fifth Turner Cup title. It was the club's first since 1993, and their sixth overall, with their last championship being the Colonial Cup in 2003. The Komets would win again the following year with an easy game five victory at home, which was the first time in franchise history they won back-to-back championships. They would follow up with a third consecutive Turner Cup in 2010, again clinching on home ice, securing a dynasty.

VHL

On April 25, 2018, in game 5 of the 2018 VHL finals, SKA-Neva defeated HC Dinamo Saint Petersburg 4–3 in a game that needed 103:36 of overtime to be settled. Svyatoslav Grebinshchikov scored the game-winning goal 3:36 of sextuple overtime.

NCAA

The longest game in NCAA hockey history was played at Notre Dame in Notre Dame, Indiana, on March 6, 2015. UMass beat Notre Dame, 4–3, in the Hockey East first round with 8:18 left in quintuple overtime. Shane Walsh scored the winning goal just after 1:00 am local time.

The previous longest was played on March 12, 2010. Quinnipiac University beat Union College, 3–2, in the ECAC Quarterfinals, as Greg Holt scored with 9:38 left in quintuple overtime. The 3rd longest game in NCAA hockey history (the longest game in NCAA playoff history) was played on March 27–28, 2021. The University of Minnesota Duluth beat the University of North Dakota 3–2. Luke Mylymok scored the game-winning goal with 17:47 left in quintuple overtime. The 4th longest game in NCAA hockey history was played on March 5, 2006. Yale University beat Union College, 3–2, in the ECAC Hockey League first-round playoff game after 81:35 of overtime. David Meckler scored the winning goal with Yale shorthanded.

The longest game in NCAA Division III hockey history, and the fourth longest in NCAA history overall, began at 7:05 pm on February 27, 2010, and ended at 12:35 am of the following day. Gustavus Adolphus College beat Augsburg College, 6–5, to advance to the MIAC championship game after 78:38 of overtime. Eric Bigham scored the winning goal.

A 2000 NCAA regional final in men's ice hockey between St. Lawrence University and Boston University ended with 63:53 of overtime. Manitoba native and minor hockey buddy of Craig McAulay, Robin Carruthers scored the game-winning goal after four periods of overtime play

A March 30, 1991, game between Northern Michigan University and Boston University ended with Northern Michigan earning an 8–7 victory over Boston University. Unlikely hero Darryl Plandowski scores in the third overtime period and fifth hour of play to give the Wildcats the title.

A March 8, 1997, game between Colorado College and the University of Wisconsin–Madison ended with Colorado College winning, 1–0, after 69:30 of overtime.

A March 14, 2003, ECAC Quarterfinal game between Colgate University and Dartmouth ended, 4–3 for Colgate, after 61:05 in overtime.

On March 26, 2006, the Wisconsin Badgers beat the Cornell Big Red 1–0 at 11:13 into the third overtime at the Midwest Regional Final in the NCAA Tournament at the Resch Center in Green Bay. It was the second-longest NCAA Tournament game in its history and the longest 1–0 game in tournament history. It is currently the ninth-longest game all-time in NCAA Division I history.

A March 11, 2007, game between St. Cloud State University and University of Minnesota Duluth during the first round of the WCHA playoffs ended with SCSU winning, 3–2, after 51:33 of overtime. It is the eighth-longest NCAA Division I game in history.

In the first round of the 2008 WCHA hockey tournament featuring the fourth-seeded Minnesota State University, Mankato Mavericks hosting the seventh-seeded University of Minnesota Golden Gophers, the Friday and Sunday games both went into double overtime, and the Saturday night game went into one overtime. The Gophers prevailed two games to one in the series, winning Saturday and Sunday.

On March 3, 2012, in the first round of the 2012 ECAC Hockey hockey tournament featuring the seventh-seeded Clarkson Golden Knights men's ice hockey team hosting the tenth-seeded RPI Engineers men's ice hockey team, Clarkson beat RPI 4–3 at 13:48 in the third overtime period, after 113:48 of play. It is currently the seventh-longest game all-time in NCAA Division I history.

NCAA women
On March 10, 1996, New Hampshire defeated Providence, 3–2, in an ECAC Women's Championship game after 85:35 of overtime. (This is not an NCAA record, as the NCAA did not officially recognize women's hockey until the 2001 season; however, it stands as the longest women's college hockey game)

On March 10, 2007, Wisconsin defeated Harvard, 1–0, in an NCAA women's quarterfinal game after 67:09 of overtime at the Kohl Center in Madison WI. Wisconsin went on to win the national championship.

On March 10, 2012, Cornell University defeated Boston University, 8–7, in an NCAA women's quarterfinal game after 59:50 of overtime at Lynah Rink in Ithaca, New York, surpassing the men's game from the previous night as the longest hockey game to be played at the rink.

On March 21, 2010, Minnesota–Duluth defeated Cornell 3–2 in the NCAA championship game, after 59:26 of overtime (119:26 total game time), the longest men's or women's hockey championship game in NCAA history.

Canadian Hockey League

The longest game in Memorial Cup history was played on May 23, 2014, in London, Ontario, where in the semi-final game, Curtis Lazar scored at 2:42 of triple overtime as the Edmonton Oil Kings beat the Val-d'Or Foreurs 4–3 to advance to the championship game. The entire overtime lasted 42:42, the overall game time played was 102:42.
The longest game in WHL & CHL history was played on April 2, 2017, in Victoria, British Columbia, in Game 6 of Round 1 between the Everett Silvertips and Victoria Royals. Cal Babych scored with 8:24 left in quintuple overtime to beat the Royals 3–2 to win the series 4–2. The total game time played was 151:36.

QMJHL

† Series-Clinching Goal

2007 RBC Cup – Canadian Jr A championship
The semi-final game for the 2007 RBC Cup, saw the host Prince George Spruce Kings taking on the Camrose Kodiaks. The game ended up being the longest game in Royal Bank Cup history at 146 minutes and 1 second. The Spruce Kings broke a 2–2 tie just over six minutes into quintuple overtime to win 3–2 and clinch a berth in the RBC Cup Final against the Aurora Tigers. Jason Yuel of the Spruce Kings scored the winner while goaltender Jordan White stopped 91 of 93 shots for the victory.

OPJHL
On February 10, 2007, the Toronto Jr. Canadiens defeated the Pickering Panthers, 4–3, to take a 2–0 series lead in the first round of the OPJHL playoffs, after 104:32 of overtime. It is the second longest game played sanctioned by Hockey Canada.

GHJHL
February 1999, the St. Catharines Falcons defeated the Port Colborne Sailors 7–6 to take a 2–1 series lead in the semi-finals of the Golden Horseshoe Jr. B Hockey League playoffs. Peter Lacey scored 11 minutes into quintuple overtime, ending the game at 2:18 am. The game started at 7:30 pm. It is the longest junior hockey game sanctioned by Hockey Canada

High school
On February 20, 2020, in Black River Falls, Wisconsin, Black River Falls Co-op vs. Viroqua Co-op girls went a total of six overtimes - a combination of 8 and 12 minute overtimes - total elapsed playtime of 122 minutes, 51 seconds, a new US High School Record. Black River Falls won 2–1 in sextuple overtime.  Viroqua goalie Abby Severson stopped 108 of 110 shots in the game.

Marquette vs Orchard Lake St Marys went eight overtimes during the Michigan State Ice Hockey Division 1 Championship game before Tournament officials stopped the game in consideration of the health and welfare of the players on March 8, 2008. The 1–1 tie resulted in the two teams being declared co-champions. The game lasted 109 minutes. Ryan Morley Stockton of St. Mary's had a MHSAA-record 58 saves.

In a 1996 FCIAC quarterfinal matchup in Darien, Connecticut, between archrivals Wilton and Ridgefield, Wilton's Bill Lenich scored after 104 minutes of hockey, in the 8th eight-minute overtime period.

The longest game in American high school history was a Aurora High School–Solon High School game in which Aurora won in the eighth overtime period of the Ohio state playoffs. The winning goal was scored with 3:52 left in the 8th overtime (105th minute), setting an American record.

Since 2015, most state tournaments allow up to 5 overtime periods (4-on-4 after first overtime), after which best-of-3-round shootouts and extra rounds if needed are conducted, to eliminate co-champions.

See also
National Hockey League
American Hockey League
Ice hockey
Ice hockey rules
Breakaway (hockey)
Season (sport)
Overtime (sports)
Easter Epic

References

 The National Hockey League Official Guide and Record Book
 Diamond, Dan; (1992), The Official National Hockey League Stanley Cup Centennial Book
 The American Hockey League Guide & Record Book

External links
List of all NHL overtime games by decade

Ice hockey rules